Russell Malcolm "Russ" Solomon
 was an American entrepreneur and art collector. He was most notable as the founder of the worldwide music store empire, Tower Records.

Personal life

Early life 
Russell Solomon was born in  Sacramento, California, and grew up there during the Great Depression. His father owned a small but successful business called Tower Cut Rate Drug Store, where Solomon worked from the age of 13, absorbing lessons from his father. He had little interest in school, and had a record of both showing up late as well as leaving early. He said in a January 2011 interview for the Sacramento Bee, that he "couldn't get up in the morning" so he'd get there about an hour before lunch and go home soon afterward. Solomon said he "was thrown out of high school,"  although he did take some classes at Sacramento Junior College. His lack of formal education did not appear to hinder him especially since he learned valuable business lessons from his father. Solomon also spent a lot of time with the photographers who processed film.

In 1941, when only sixteen, he sold used juke box records out of his father's drug store. When war broke out later that year, his business career was interrupted by military service. When the war was over, he returned to the drug store and his fledgling retail operation.

Marriages and family 
In 1945, Solomon married his first wife, Doris, and their first son, Michael, was born three years later. They also have a second son, David, born in 1962. Solomon and Doris separated in 1973, but remained on good terms. In 2010, he married Patti Drosins after a long friendship

Early career 
In 1952, Solomon took his merchandising business from a few racks in the drug store owned by his father, Clayton, to a full-fledged sales company in a building across the street. He bought stock on credit and soon found himself in financial difficulties as sales failed to keep up with expenses. By 1960, his record company creditors had moved in and forced him to close. Solomon borrowed $5,000 from his father and started MTS Inc., named after his son, Michael. A month later, he was back in business with a new store at 2514 Watt Avenue Arden Arcade, Ca. a suburb of Sacramento, December 15, 1961, that formed the foundation for his international business.

Tower Records 
Eight years later, Solomon signed a lease for a  storefront in San Francisco. Encouraged by the immediate profitability of the second store, Russell Solomon expanded to Los Angeles in 1970 and added 26 more locations in the next ten years, including the Sapporo, Japan store in April 1980. Over the next decade, Tower Records spread across the globe selling books and videos in addition to music. In May 1998, MTS Inc. sold $110 million worth of notes to finance more international growth. They also received a $275 million line of credit from a group of large banks and one year later the company reported its first loss. Even though it made $76 million in the previous nine months, the interest payments had resulted in the company losing money. Although they continued to expand, Tower Records never recovered and, in 2006, the company was forced to liquidate and close. At one time, Solomon maintained a collage of neckties collected from visitors on the wall outside his office.

After bankruptcy 
Even after losing his business, 81-year-old Russell Solomon continued working. He went back to his first store location in Sacramento and planned a new store opening under the name R5 Records. The new operation opened just six months after Tower Records shut down. Although he no longer had the rights to the Tower name, Solomon used the same color scheme and the new logo was created by Mick Michelson, the same designer who had done the original Tower Records logo in the sixties. Solomon was joined in the effort by several long time employees. This time Solomon provided his own financing. The new store was patterned after the Tower format because Solomon still believed that "All we need to do is the things that made Tower successful." The new store never really got off the ground and after less than three years Solomon sold it to Dimple Records, a local Sacramento chain. Dimple's co-owner John Radakovits turned his grand opening into a retirement party for Russell Solomon. Radakovits included a large oil painting of the Tower Records founder in his rock 'n' roll memorabilia display and dedicated the store to his long-time competitor and friend. Many of Tower Records former employees attended the retirement party to reminisce and celebrate with Solomon.

Solomon died of an apparent heart attack on March 4, 2018, according to the Sacramento Bee while drinking whiskey and watching the Academy Awards, after having just commented negatively on someone  at the ceremonies' fashion choice.

References

External links 
 Tower.com
 Russ Solomon on Tower's rise and fall

1925 births
2018 deaths
American chief executives
American music industry executives
American art collectors
Businesspeople from Sacramento, California
Businesspeople from San Francisco
20th-century American businesspeople